is a subway station in the central part of Shinjuku, Tokyo, Japan.

Lines 
Toei Ōedo Line (E-03)

Platforms
The station consists of an island platform serving two tracks.

Surroundings 
 Aikikai Hombu Dojo
Statistics Bureau
Ogasawara-Hakushaku-Tei
National Institute of Infectious Diseases
Waseda University

History
In the past, the area was served by Tram Line 13, which was abolished in 1970. After that, there was no alternative rail connections and was instead served by Toei Bus. Afterwards, a new station along the new Toei Line 12 (now known as the Oedo Line) was to be constructed just halfway between Wakamatsucho and Kawatacho.

The name of the composite station, which is made up of two street names, is due to the consideration of the two towns, but the relocation of Fuji Television also has a significant effect. Kawata-cho has long been known as the headquarters location of Fuji Television nationwide, but in March 1997 Fuji Television moved to Daiba, Minato-ku, and a luxury rental tower of the Urban Renaissance Agency was relocated to the site. The apartment "Kawatacho Comfo Garden" was built. Also, on the southeast side of the road, there was Fuji TV Daiichi Annex, which was also used as the "Fuji TV Shinjuku Branch Office" until 2008, after which it was dismantled to become rental housing.

Toei had been constructing this station with the working name "Wakamatsucho Station" from an early stage, but in consideration of the concerns from a local shopping street (Fuji TV Shimo-dori) about a decline due to the relocation of Fuji TV, "Kawada" was adopted as the station name, but confusion was expected if the station name was completely different from the tentative station name, so the name of "Wakamatsu" was retained, and the new station adopted the name "Wakamatsu Kawada Station".

The closest station to Fuji TV was Akebonobashi Station on the Toei Shinjuku Line.

External links
This article incorporates information from the corresponding article on the Japanese Wikipedia.

Official station webpage (in Japanese)

Railway stations in Japan opened in 2000
Toei Ōedo Line
Stations of Tokyo Metropolitan Bureau of Transportation
Railway stations in Tokyo